The 2015 Turkey blackout was a widespread power outage that occurred in almost all parts of Turkey in the morning of Tuesday, 31 March 2015. 

Due to line maintenance on the main East-West corridor, which connects hydropower rich Eastern Turkey with the population centers in Western Turkey, the remaining lines became overloaded after the Osmanca – Kursunlu line tripped, as the system was not in a n-1 secure state. The electric system in Turkey split in half at CET 09:36:11 and separated from the Central European (CE) synchronous zone, i.e. connecting lines to Greece and Bulgaria also tripped. This was the reason that the disturbances only had effects in Turkey and did not cascade to neighbouring countries.

The two parts inside Turkey behaved differently. The Western part suffered from a lack generation (21%) and frequency went down. Load shedding schemes did stabilize the frequency, but as some power plants in Turkey did not cope with running at reduced frequency, additional power was lost and resulted in a blackout of the Western part. The Eastern part suffered from hydropower oversupply (41%) that wasn't able to flow westward. The Eastern part was accelerated by ca. 1.6 Hz/s and culminated at 52.3 Hz. Power plants tripped due to overfrequency and the initially oversupplied Eastern part collapsed at underfrequency values less than 47.0 Hz.

At 16:12 (CET) - ca. 6.5 hours after the blackout - the Western and Eastern part were resynchronised, while the Turkish grid was already about 80% energized. At 18:30 almost 95% of the loads were served again.

External links
ENTSOE, Report on Blackout in Turkey on 31 March 2015, 21 September 2015

References

2015 in Turkey
Turkey
March 2015 events in Turkey
2015 disasters in Turkey